Natural neighbor interpolation is a method of spatial interpolation, developed by Robin Sibson. The method is based on Voronoi tessellation of a discrete set of spatial points. This has advantages over simpler methods of interpolation, such as nearest-neighbor interpolation, in that it provides a smoother approximation to the underlying "true" function.

The basic equation is:

The weights, are calculated by finding how much of each of the surrounding areas is "stolen" when inserting  into the tessellation.

Sibson weights

Laplace weights

See also
 Inverse distance weighting
 Multivariate interpolation

References

External links
 Natural Neighbor Interpolation
 Implementation notes for natural neighbor, and comparison to other interpolation methods
 Interactive Voronoi diagram and natural neighbor interpolation visualization
 Fast, discrete natural neighbor interpolation in 3D on the CPU

Multivariate interpolation